The NZI Wellington Sevens is played annually as part of the IRB Sevens World Series for international rugby sevens (seven-a-side version of rugby union). The 2009 competition, which takes place on 6 and 7 February is the third Cup trophy in the 2008-09 IRB Sevens World Series.

Teams

Pool Stages

Pool A
{| class="wikitable" style="text-align: center;"
|-
!width="200"|Team
!width="40"|Pld
!width="40"|W
!width="40"|D
!width="40"|L
!width="40"|PF
!width="40"|PA
!width="40"|+/-
!width="40"|Pts
|- 
|align=left| 
|3||2||0||1||57||50||+7||7
|-
|align=left| 
|3||2||0||1||63||27||+36||7
|-
|align=left| 
|3||1||0||2||40||58||-18||5
|-
|align=left| 
|3||1||0||2||34||59||-25||5
|}

Pool B
{| class="wikitable" style="text-align: center;"
|-
!width="200"|Team
!width="40"|Pld
!width="40"|W
!width="40"|D
!width="40"|L
!width="40"|PF
!width="40"|PA
!width="40"|+/-
!width="40"|Pts
|- 
|align=left| 
|3||2||0||1||86||54||+32||7
|-
|align=left| 
|3||2||0||1||79||51||+28||7
|-
|align=left| 
|3||2||0||1||65||58||+7||7
|-
|align=left| 
|3||0||0||3||34||101||-67||3
|}

Pool C
{| class="wikitable" style="text-align: center;"
|-
!width="200"|Team
!width="40"|Pld
!width="40"|W
!width="40"|D
!width="40"|L
!width="40"|PF
!width="40"|PA
!width="40"|+/-
!width="40"|Pts
|- 
|align=left| 
|3||2||1||0||63||43||+20||8
|-
|align=left| 
|3||2||0||1||65||30||+35||7
|-
|align=left| 
|3||0||2||1||36||63||-27||5
|-
|align=left| 
|3||0||1||2||43||71||-28||4
|}

Pool D
{| class="wikitable" style="text-align: center;"
|-
!width="200"|Team
!width="40"|Pld
!width="40"|W
!width="40"|D
!width="40"|L
!width="40"|PF
!width="40"|PA
!width="40"|+/-
!width="40"|Pts
|- 
|align=left| 
|3||2||0||1||84||20||+64||7
|-
|align=left| 
|3||2||0||1||73||36||+37||7
|-
|align=left| 
|3||2||0||1||43||41||+2||7
|-
|align=left| 
|3||0||0||3||5||108||+103||3
|}

Knockout

Shield

Bowl

Plate

Cup

Statistics

Individual points

Individual tries

References

External links 
 New Zealand Rugby 7s
 IRB Sevens
 New Zealand 7s on irb.com
 Wellington Sevens Profile on UR7s.com

Wellington Sevens
Wellington
2009